Kornhaber Brown is an independent video production company based in New York City. The company has created shows and campaigns for MTV, PBS, Riot Games, Complex Networks, Condé Nast, Fusion, YouTube, Univision, AMC Networks, and HGTV.

History

Kornhaber Brown was founded in 2009 by Eric Brown and Andrew Kornhaber. Its first notable release was the video Porn Sex vs. Real Sex: The Differences Explained With Food, which received over eighteen million views and was honored by The Webby Awards in 2014.

It created the PBS Digital Studios series Off Book, Idea Channel Game/Show, Infinite Series, Stellar, and Space Time, and the MTV series Braless, Pants Off, Decoded, and The Racket. 

The company was honored by The Webby Awards for Idea Channel, Braless and Decoded.

Productions

Original channels/series
 PBS | PBS Off Book
 PBS | PBS Idea Channel
 PBS | PBS Game/Show
PBS | PBS Infinite Series 
 PBS | PBS Space Time
PBS | Stellar
 MTV | MTV Braless
 MTV | MTV Decoded
 MTV | The Racket
 MTV | Pants Off
Complex Networks | Group Therapy
 Riot Games | /All Chat
 Wired | Data Attack
 Flama | Secret Life of Babes
 Scripps Network | Awkward Moments
 Scripps Network | Do Better Daily
 HGTV | Can I Come In?

Viral videos
 AMC | "Could You Rip Out A Spine?" (2015) 
 Glamour Magazine | "The History of the Bra: Styles From Every Fashion Era" (2015) 
 YouTube Advertisers | "What Do You Really Know About Gamers?" (2015) 
 Wired | "The Female Orgasm, Explained with Science Projects" (2015) 
 Carnegie Hall | "43 Cartoon Theme Song Mashup | Ensemble ACJW" (2014) 
 EngenderHealth |  "History's Worst Contraceptives: WTFP?! — WheresTheFP.org" (2014) 
 Kornhaber Brown | "Porn Sex vs Real Sex: The Differences Explained With Food" (2013) 
 New York Theatre Workshop | "A Look At The New Musical, ONCE" (2012) 
 MTV | "Everything You Know About Thanksgiving is Wrong" (2015)
 MTV | "White People Whitesplain Whitesplaining" (2015)

Awards

The Webby Awards

 People's Voice  - Online Film & Video  - Public Service & Activism (Channel) (2015) - MTV Braless
 Online Film & Video - First Person (2014) - PBS Idea Channel
 Best Host (2013) - Mike Rugnetta - PBS Idea Channel
Video Series & Channels (2017) - Public Service & Activism - MTV Decoded

CINE

 Golden Eagle Award  - Narrative Content: Series/MiniSeries— Episodes of 30 Minutes or Less (2015)  - 60SECOND PRESIDENTS

The Mashies

 Best Video Series (2013) - PBS Idea Channel

References

External links
Official website

Video production companies
Mass media companies based in New York City